Yonkers station is a Metro-North Railroad and Amtrak railroad station located in Yonkers, New York. It serves Metro-North commuter trains on the Hudson Line. It is one of four express stations on the line south of Croton–Harmon, but most Metro North express trains do not stop here. It is the only intercity rail station in the southwestern portion of Westchester County, connecting the region to Albany and points beyond.

The station is two blocks west of the center of Getty Square in downtown Yonkers (where additional Bee-Line Bus System connections can be made), across the street from the historic Yonkers Post Office. It is also near the former Yonkers Trolley Barn.

, daily commuter ridership was 922. Four outdoor bicycle parking racks sit across Buena Vista Avenue from the station at the edge of Van Der Donck Park.

History
The current station building was built in 1911 for the New York Central & Hudson River Railroad (NYC) in the Beaux-Arts style. The architects were Warren and Wetmore, one of the firms responsible for Grand Central Terminal. It was meant to be a smaller version of Grand Central; Guastavino tiles are featured prominently in both stations.

Upon the merger of the NYC and the Pennsylvania Railroad in 1968, the station became a Penn Central commuter rail station. By this time, intercity service to Yonkers had ended. Penn Central continued operating commuter travel until 1976, when it was taken over by Conrail, which in turn transferred the service to Metro-North in 1983. Intercity service returned to Yonkers in 1989 after a two-decade absence in an effort to revitalize the Saw Mill riverfront. In 2004, Metro-North completed a $43 million restoration of the Yonkers station.

The ticket office at the station closed on July 7, 2010, so that passengers must now buy their tickets from vending machines at street level.  A Metro-North Railroad Police substation is in the terminal on the ground floor.

Station layout
The station has two high-level island platforms each 10 cars long.

References

Further reading

External links 

Governor Pataki Celebrates Restoration of Historic Yonkers Station (N.Y. State press release)
Station House from Google Maps Street View
Comparison of Yonkers Train Station with Grand Central Terminal

Metro-North Railroad stations in New York (state)
Former New York Central Railroad stations
Amtrak stations in New York (state)
Transportation in Yonkers, New York
Railway stations in Westchester County, New York
Railway stations in the United States opened in 1911
Warren and Wetmore buildings
1911 establishments in New York (state)
Transportation in Westchester County, New York